Drillia quadrasi is a species of sea snail, a marine gastropod mollusk in the family Drilliidae.

Description
The length of the shell of the shell varies between 9 mm and 16½ mm; its diameter attains 6½ mm.

Distribution
This marine species occurs off the Philippines.

References

 Tucker, J.K. 2004 Catalog of recent and fossil turrids (Mollusca: Gastropoda). Zootaxa 682:1–1295

External links
 

quadrasi
Gastropods described in 1895